The Guggenheim Hermitage Museum was a museum owned and originally operated by the Solomon R. Guggenheim Foundation.  It was located in The Venetian Resort Hotel Casino on the Las Vegas Strip, and the Venetian took over the museum's operations in 2007.  It was designed by architect Rem Koolhaas and opened on October 7, 2001, one of two Guggenheim museums to open in Las Vegas in 2001 and the third art installation on the Strip. The Guggenheim Las Vegas closed in 2003.  The Guggenheim Hermitage was the result of a collaboration agreement between the State Hermitage Museum in St Petersburg, Russia, and the Solomon R. Guggenheim Foundation, and its exhibitions featured works held by both institutions.

The collaboration between the two museums began in the late 1990s, and construction followed quickly after, but attendance never reached projected levels.
The museum, known as the "Jewel Box", closed on May 11, 2008 after it failed to attract community support.   It attracted over 1.1 million visitors with ten exhibitions of masterworks by leading artists from the last six centuries, from Van Eyck, Titian and Velázquez, to Van Gogh, Picasso, Pollock, and Lichtenstein.

See also
 List of Guggenheim Museums

References

Hermitage Museum
Guggenheim Museum
Rem Koolhaas buildings
Defunct museums in Nevada
Museums in the Las Vegas Valley
Art museums established in 2001
2001 establishments in Nevada
Art museums disestablished in 2008
2008 disestablishments in Nevada